Kain is a surname that is German, Jewish and Scottish. Notable people with the surname include:

Adria Kain, African-Canadian singer
Alfred Kain (1927-2010), Austrian cyclist
Andy Kain (born 1985), English rugby league player
Bob Kain, American businessman
Conrad Kain (1883–1934), Austrian mountain guide
Edgar Kain (1918–1940), New Zealand fighter ace of WWII
Eugenie Kain (1960–2010), Austrian writer
Frances Ida Kain (1908–1997), New Zealand dietitian and women’s air force leader
Franz Kain (1922-1997), Austrian writer and politician
Gabriella Kain (born 1981), Swedish handball player
Gylan Kain, African-American poet and playwright
Joanna M. Kain (1930-2017), New Zealand phycologist, marine biologist and driver
John Kain (rugby league), British rugby league player
John F. Kain (1935-2003), American economist
John Joseph Kain (1841–1903), American Roman Catholic archbishop
Joseph Kain (1854-1907), American politician and businessman
Karen Kain (born 1951), Canadian dancer
Kevin Kain, Canadian tropical disease expert
Khalil Kain (born 1968), African-American actor and rapper
Marty Kain (born 1988), New Zealand cricketer
Roger Kain, British geographer
Saul Kain, pen name of Siegfried Sassoon (1886–1967), English poet, writer, and soldier
Sutter Kain (born 1944), African-American rapper and music producer
Thomas Kain (1907–1971), American baseball pitcher
Tom Kain (born 1963), American soccer player and businessman

See also
 Kain (given name)
 Kain (disambiguation)